
Gmina Niechlów is a rural gmina (administrative district) in Góra County, Lower Silesian Voivodeship, in south-western Poland.

Neighbouring gminas
Gmina Niechlów is bordered by the gminas of Góra, Jemielno, Pęcław, Rudna and Szlichtyngowa.

Villages
The gmina contains the villages of Bartodzieje, Bełcz Wielki, Bogucin, Głobice, Karów, Klimontów, Łękanów, Lipowiec, Masełkowice, Miechów, Naratów, Niechlów, Siciny, Świerczów, Szaszorowice, Tarpno, Wągroda, Wioska, Wroniniec, Wronów, Żabin and Żuchlów.

Twin towns – sister cities

Gmina Niechlów is twinned with:
 Röderaue, Germany

References

Niechlow
Góra County